Easy Livin' is an album by composer/arranger/keyboardist Clare Fischer, a program of standards featuring both solo piano performances and piano-bass duets, recorded on August 8, 1963, given a limited release in 1966 (see original album cover below), and reissued in 1968 on the Revelation label.

Track listing
Composer credits and durations derived from album images.

Side One
 "In Your Own Sweet Way" (Dave Brubeck) - 4:05
 "Glad to Be Unhappy" (Richard Rodgers & Lorenz Hart) - 2:18
 "Aquarius" (João Donato) - 4:12
 "My Pretty Girl" (Charles Fulcher) - 2:14
 "Kerry Dancer" (Irish traditional) - 4:55
 "Goodbye" (Gordon Jenkins) 5:17
Side Two
 "I'll Take Romance" (Ben Oakland & Oscar Hammerstein II) - 11:44
"Easy Livin' [sic]'" (Ralph Rainger & Leo Robin) - 10:44

Personnel
Clare Fischer - piano
Bobby West - bass (Side One, track 6; Side Two, tracks 1-2)

References

External links 
 Album & album cover images at eBay

1966 albums
Clare Fischer albums
Instrumental albums
Revelation Records (jazz) albums